Napfspitze may refer to various mountains in the Zillertal Alps in Austria and Italy:
Napfspitze (Ahrntal) (3,144 m), also called the Dreiecketer
Napfspitze (Schwaz) (2,925 m), a subpeak southwest of the  Realspitze
Napfspitze (Eisbruggjoch) (2,888 m)